Nemania is a genus of fungi in the family Xylariaceae. The widespread genus contains 44 species. The anamorph form of Nemania species have historically been placed in the genus Geniculosporium.

Species

N. abortiva
N. aenea
N. albocincta
N. angusta
N. atropurpurea
N. beaumontii
N. bipapillata
N. carbonacea
N. caries
N. chestersii
N. chrysoconia
N. circostoma
N. confluens
N. costaricensis
N. creoleuca
N. diffusa
N. effusa
N. flavitextura
N. gwyneddii
N. illita
N. immersidiscus
N. kauaiensis
N. kellermanii
N. latissima
N. macrocarpa
N. maculosa
N. maritima
N. memorabilis
N. minutula
N. nummularioides
N. plumbea
N. pouzarii
N. primolutea
N. pseudoillita
N. quadrata
N. ravenelii
N. saladerana
N. serpens
N. sphaeriostoma
N. subaenea
N. venezuelen

References

Xylariales